The Intelligence Men is a 1965 comedy film starring the British comic duo Eric Morecambe and Ernie Wise. In the US, it was retitled Spylarks. It is subtitled "M.I.5 plus 2 equals 0".

The film was successful enough to enable Morecambe and Wise to make two further films, That Riviera Touch and The Magnificent Two.

Plot
Eric (Eric Morecambe), in his London coffee bar, is happily serving black coffee to a sinister-looking man (Tutte Lemkow) when the man tries to persuade him to remember a tune. Unfortunately, Eric is tone-deaf. Ernie Sage (Ernie Wise) enters the coffee bar and Eric tries to get him to identify the tune, without much success. Eventually, Sage realises that this could be something to do with a forthcoming visit by a Russian trade delegation and an assassination attempt by an organisation known as "SCHLECHT" (a parody of SPECTRE from the James Bond films; the word is German for "bad" or "evil", although there is little evidence of German involvement to sabotage this mission).

He reports this to his superiors in Military Intelligence (although he is little more than an office-boy), and they reluctantly agree that only Eric, having heard the tune, will be able to lead them to the centre of the plot. Eric is persuaded to pose as a British agent – the recently deceased Major Cavendish – who had managed to infiltrate SCHLECHT. After a few set-piece comedy interludes, the tune is identified and the plot switches to a performance of Swan Lake at the projected venue for the assassination, where the star Russian ballerina Madame Petrovna (April Olrich) is in grave danger.

This section provides some of the funniest moments of the film: for example, Eric, masquerading as a Russian, adopts a broad Scottish highland accent; and during the ballet performance itself, Eric and Ernie, dressed in Egyptian costumes, get mixed up in the "Dance of the Little Swans". Finally, however, the villain is unmasked and all ends happily.

Cast
Eric Morecambe - Eric
Ernie Wise - Ernie Sage
William Franklyn - Colonel Grant
April Olrich - Madame Petrovna
Gloria Paul - Gina Carlotti
Richard Vernon - Sir Edward Seabrook
David Lodge - Stage Manager
Jacqueline Jones - Karin
Terence Alexander - Reed
Francis Matthews - Thomas
Warren Mitchell - Prozoroff
Peter Bull - Philippe
Tutte Lemkow - Seedy SCHLECHT Agent
Brian Oulton - Laundry Basket Man
Michael Peake - Sinister Stranger

Reception
Critic Leslie Halliwell awarded the film no stars, describing it as an "inept and rather embarrassing big-screen debut for two excellent television comedians".

The film was one of the 12 most popular movies at the British box office in 1965.

Notes

External links

Eric And Ern - Keeping The Magic Alive  **Book, Film, TV Reviews, Interviews**

1965 films
British spy comedy films
Cold War spy films
1960s spy comedy films
Films shot at Pinewood Studios
Films directed by Robert Asher
Morecambe and Wise
Films set in London
1965 comedy films
Parody films based on James Bond films
1960s English-language films